The coat of arms of the Region of Murcia is described in the article 4 of the Spanish Organic Law 4 of 9 June 1982, the Statute of Autonomy of the Region of Murcia  and further regulated by Decree 34 of 8 June 1983, approving the official design and use of the coat of arms of the Region of Murcia.

Shield 
The first official description of the coat of arms remits to the elements of the flag and is composed as follows:

Given the lack of precision to define a correct blazon, was approved a decree on  8 June 1983 blazoned the shield of the region as follows:

The four castles evoke the region's history as a frontier zone caught between the Crown of Aragon and the Kingdom of Castile, and the Nasrid Kingdom of Granada and the Mediterranean Sea: four territories of land and sea, Christians and Muslims, adventurers and warriors, all of which created a distinct Murcian culture.  The four castles also can refer to the four lordships that initially carved up the area after it was conquered by Alfonso X of Castile.

The seven crowns were granted to the Kingdom of Murcia by the Castilian Crown. The first five crowns were granted by Alfonso X on 14 May 1281, when he granted the standard and municipal seal to the capital city of Murcia. The sixth crown was granted by Peter of Castile on 4 May 1361, in honour of the loyalty of Murcia shown to Peter's cause during the War of the Two Peters. The seventh crown was granted by Philip V of Spain on 16 September 1709 in honour of the loyalty of Murcia shown to Philip's cause during the War of the Spanish Succession.

Official design 
 The official design is commonly used by the autonomous institutions of Murcia, although it coexists with a simplified design of it (a logo).
 According to the official blazon, the official design is not designed to conform to traditional heraldic rules.
 The blazon does not specify that the castles not specify that they are open or they must have voided gates and windows, usually Azure, and their design should include at least two windows.
 Proportions of the charges in relation to the dimensions of the shield are wrong, according to the blazon, they are inscribed in the dexter canton and the sinister base, so each group of charges should equal the ninth part of the escutcheon. 

 The shield shape is rectangular with convex corners  at the bottom and the Spanish style, with an almost semicircular bottom edge. The official design has a bordure Or not blazoned.
 The Spanish Royal Crown has not a cap Gules, an element commonly represented in Spanish heraldry.
 The escutcheon of the official logo, approved in 2008, best fits to the official blazon.

Former Provincial Council 
Shortly before the establishment of the self-government, the Council of the Province of Murcia officially approved a coat of arms, that was used previously since 12 July 1976 (the Spanish monarchy was restored in November 1975). The provincial coat of arms appeared in the center of a cobalt blue flag. The Murcia Province quarterings and a central inescutcheon were standing for: Caravaca de la Cruz, Cartagena, Cieza, Lorca, Mula, Totana, La Unión, Yecla and the City of Murcia (inescutcheon). The crest was the Spanish Royal Crown. Its usage ended with the adoption of the current symbols of the autonomous community on 9 August 1982.

See also 
Flag of the Region of Murcia

References

External links 
Coat of arms of Murcia. Heraldry of the World. Retrieved 18 July 2018.
Institutional image. Government of the Region of Murcia website.

Coat of arms of the former Provincial Council of Murcia. Murcia: Provincial Council of Murcia. [Spanish Virtual Library of Bibliographic Heritage].

Region of Murcia
Murcia Region
Murcia Region
Murcia Region